Cameron Palmer (born 15 May 2000) is a Northern Irish professional footballer who plays as a midfielder for Linfield in the NIFL Premiership.

A product of the Rangers youth academy, Palmer has previously had loan spells with Partick Thistle, Orange County and Clyde.

Club career

Early career
Palmer was born in York, England and raised in Toronto, Ontario, Canada. He is the son of Don Palmer, a church pastor, author and speaker, currently based in Glasgow, but originally from Belfast. Cammy (Cameron) moved with his family to Canada when he was only 8 months old. He started playing competitive soccer at age 5, playing for Pickering SC, Ajax SC and eventually Whitby Iroquois SC. Whilst playing for Whitby in Ontario, former Rangers player Andy Kennedy came across the young footballer. Kennedy contacted Rangers and told them about the youngster. His family moved back to Scotland in 2011 and Palmer went on trial and very soon joined the youth ranks of the Glasgow giants. After impressing at numerous levels at the club, Palmer was named as the reserve side’s team captain in 2018.

Professional career
After a solid progression at youth level for Rangers, Palmer signed a contract extension with the Ibrox side until 2021 in June 2019.

On 10 July 2019, Palmer joined Scottish Championship side Partick Thistle on loan until January 2020. Three days later Palmer made his professional footballing debut in a 1-0 win in the Scottish League Cup against Airdrieonians at Firhill. Palmer scored his first professional goal scoring for Thistle in a 3-1 away win over Inverness.

On 3 February 2020, Palmer joined USL Championship club Orange County SC on loan for the 2020 season.

Palmer was loaned to Scottish League One club Clyde in October 2020.

On 27 January 2021, Palmer joined NIFL Premiership side Linfield on an 18-month contract.

Honours 
Linfield
 NIFL Premiership: 2020-21
 Irish Cup: 2020-21

References

External links
 
 
 Scotland profile at Scottish FA

2000 births
Living people
Association football midfielders
Association footballers from Northern Ireland
Partick Thistle F.C. players
Rangers F.C. players
Orange County SC players
Scottish Professional Football League players
Footballers from York
USL Championship players
Clyde F.C. players
English expatriate footballers
Expatriate association footballers from Northern Ireland
English expatriate sportspeople in the United States
Expatriate sportspeople from Northern Ireland in the United States
Expatriate soccer players in the United States
Pickering FC players